Shirl Conway (born Shirley Elizabeth Crosman, June 13, 1916 – May 7, 2007) was an American television and Broadway actress.

Early years
A great-niece of actress Henrietta Crosman, Conway graduated from the University of Michigan in 1938 with a bachelor's degree in speech therapy. She was a John Robert Powers model.

Career 
Banjo Eyes (1940) was Conway's theatrical debut. She played Ruth Winters in the 1955 musical comedy Plain and Fancy on Broadway, for which she won a Theatre World Award. She also appeared on Broadway in Gentlemen Prefer Blondes  and toured in Auntie Mame, including performances in the capital cities of Australia.

She played the role of Liz Thorpe in the CBS drama The Nurses (which ran from 1962 to 1965) for which she was nominated for an Emmy award in 1963 for Outstanding Continued Performance by an Actress in a Series. Other TV credits include Route 66, The Defenders, and Caesar's Hour.

She moved to Washington in 1972, where she was the founding member of the Harstine Island Theatre Club, and starred in productions there into her 80s.

Personal life 
Conway was married to engineer Gordon Larson and Bill Johnson, an actor.

Selected filmography
 The Strangers Came (1949)

References

External links
Shirl Conway in AusStage

1916 births
2007 deaths
Theatre World Award winners
20th-century American actresses
People from Cattaraugus County, New York
People from Shelton, Washington
Actresses from New York (state)
University of Michigan alumni
American stage actresses
21st-century American women